Tamer Hussein is an Egyptian lyricist and composer, who has won several awards and honors as the best poet in Egypt.He has composed Egyptian-genre songs for numerous singers in the MENA region, including Amr Diab     , Tamer Hosny, Elissa, Samira Said, Sherine Abdel Wahab, Husseini, Amal Maher, Mohamed Hamaki, Jannat, Nancy Ajram, Carole Samaha, Asala, Bahaa Sultan, Wael Jassar,  Hani Shaker, and others. He also composed the score for the film "Al Molhed" (The Atheist) in 2014.

Discography 
Ayamy (2007) Wrote (Ana Nsitek, Seeb El Waqt Yeady, Yady El Gheba, Ala Eidek, Baheb Fek, We Eh Yemna'a)Alama Fi Hyatak (2008) Wrote (Alama Fi Hyatak, Sraht Feek, Mansash, Za'alan Alek)Wayah  (2009) Wrote  (Wayah)Hassa Beek (2017 ) Wrote (Zabbat W Khattat)El Omr (2020)  Wrote  (Sukkar Zeyada)Hdoudi Sama (2009) Wrote (Ragaalak)Hob Gamed (2013) Wrote (El Bady Azlam)''

Awards  
The poet Tamer Hussein won several awards as the best lyricist in Egypt, including:

 World Music Awards: Album (El Lila) with singer Amr Diab
 Arab poet four times on the album Best and Sweetest 2016, 2018, 2020 and 2021.
 Washwasha Award for Best Poet, Excellence Award 2018.
 Best Poet of the Year 2021 dear guest Festival.
 The most successful song of 2019 (Nasini Leh) by singer Tamer Hosny.
 The most successful song of 2018 (Yetalemo ) by singer Amr Diab from the album Kol Hayati.

References 

Egyptian composers
Egyptian poets
Egyptian singer-songwriters
21st-century Egyptian male singers
1984 births
Living people